Bostridge is a surname of English origin. Notable people with the surname include:

 Ian Bostridge (born 1964), English tenor
 Mark Bostridge (active from 1995), British writer and critic

See also
 

Surnames of English origin